Michael Scott Brisiel (born March 14, 1983) is a former American football guard. He played college football at Colorado State and was signed by the Houston Texans as an undrafted free agent in 2006.

Brisiel has also been a member of the Hamburg Sea Devils and Oakland Raiders.

Early years
Born in San Marcos, Texas, Brisiel graduated from Fayetteville High School in Fayetteville, Arkansas in 2001. In addition to football, Brisiel also played on the baseball and track and field teams at Fayetteville High. As a high school football player, Brisiel was selected to the all-Arkansas team. He played college football at Colorado State. At Colorado State, Brisiel played for three seasons from 2002 to 2004 after redshirting his freshman year. He was an All-Mountain West Conference honorable mention in 2004.

Professional career

Houston Texans
Brisiel was originally signed by the Texans as an undrafted free agent in 2006. He played two preseason games with the Texans as a rookie and spent the regular season on the practice squad. Prior to the 2007 NFL season, Brisiel played as center with the NFL Europe team Hamburg Sea Devils.

In 2007, Brisiel started 4 games, replacing Fred Weary at right guard between Chris Myers and Eric Winston. In 2008, these three started all 16 games and, except for injuries, were together up to the end of the 2011 NFL season. On October 12, 2008, Brisiel was a key factor in the final offensive play of the Houston Texans' 29-28 comeback victory over the Miami Dolphins at Reliant Stadium. While the wide receivers pulled defensive attention towards the sidelines on the Texans' last-ditch 4th-and-2 play, Brisiel blocked the one defensive lineman who had a chance to tackle quarterback Matt Schaub as he ran the ball in from 3 yards out for the decisive score.

Brisiel started only 5 games in 2009, replaced by Chris White, then 9 in 2010 and 13 in 2011, when he played in his first playoff game, a win against the Cincinnati Bengals, followed by a loss to the Baltimore Ravens.

Oakland Raiders
Brisiel signed with the Oakland Raiders on March 16, 2012. He was released on April 1, 2014.

References

External links
Oakland Raiders bio
Colorado State Rams bio

1983 births
Living people
American football offensive guards
Colorado State Rams football players
Fayetteville High School (Arkansas) alumni
Hamburg Sea Devils players
Houston Texans players
Oakland Raiders players
Sportspeople from San Marcos, Texas
Players of American football from Arkansas
Players of American football from Texas